The men's 4x100 metres relay at the 2013 IPC Athletics World Championships was held at the Stade du Rhône from 20–29 July.

Medalists

See also
List of IPC world records in athletics

References

4x100 metres relay
4 × 100 metres relay at the World Para Athletics Championships